Shunhe Hui District is a district of the city of Kaifeng, Henan province, China.

Administrative divisions
As 2012, this district is divided to 6 subdistricts and 2 towns.
Subdistricts

Towns
Dongjiao Township
Tubaigang Township

References

County-level divisions of Henan
Hui people